William Harrison was an English footballer who played as a forward for Redcar, Middlesbrough, The Wednesday and Blackburn Olympic.

Life and career
Harrison was born in 1858 in Lancaster. He worked as an elementary school inspector and moved to Redcar in the 1870s to find work alongside his brother Thomas.

He helped to establish the town's first football club, Redcar and Coatham where he became captain.

References

1858 births
1890 deaths
People from Lancaster, Lancashire
English footballers
Association football forwards
Middlesbrough F.C. players
Sheffield Wednesday F.C. players
Blackburn Olympic F.C. players